The CMLL World Middleweight Championship (Campeonato Mundial Peso Medio de CMLL in Spanish) is a professional wrestling world championship promoted by the Mexican Lucha Libre wrestling-based promotion Consejo Mundial de Lucha Libre (CMLL). As it is a professional wrestling championship, it is not won legitimately; it is instead won via a scripted ending to a match or awarded to a wrestler because of a storyline. Because Lucha Libre emphasizes the lower weight classes, this division is considered more important than the normally more prestigious heavyweight division of a promotion. All title matches take place under two out of three falls rules.

Blue Panther was officially recognized as the first champion in 1991, after winning a 16-man tournament. The championship's history was interrupted in 1992 when Blue Panther left CMLL to work for rival promotion Asistencia Asesoría y Administración (AAA). El Dandy defeated Negro Casas in a singles match to decide the new champion. El Dandy has had the most reigns as champion, with three; he also has the shortest reign, at 63 days. Dragón Rojo Jr.'s single championship reign is the longest reign, at 1,954 days. Overall, there have been 16 champions across 20 reigns, with 2 vacancies.

Title history

Combined reigns

Notes

References

General source for title changes before 2000

Specific

External links
 CMLL World Middleweight Title History at Cagematch.net

Consejo Mundial de Lucha Libre championships
CMLL World Middleweight Championship
Middleweight wrestling championships